A per-seat license (or "named user license") is a  software license model based on the number of individual users who have access to a digital service or product. For example, 50-user per-seat  license would mean that up to 50 individual named users can access the program.

Per seat licensing is administered by providing user-level security to the directory containing the program. It contrasts with the concurrent user license, based on the number of simultaneous users (regardless of which individuals they are) accessing the program. It typically deals with software running in the server where users connect via the network. For example, in a 50-user concurrent use license, after 50 users are logged on to the program, the 51st user is blocked. When any one of the first 50 logs off, the next person can log on. Concurrent licensing can be managed by the application itself or via independent software metering tools.

Per seat licensing often imposes restrictions on the users. A user may be a person, software or device accessing the software. User licenses may be differentiated by user types, as authorized users, external user, internal user, qualified user, etc. User types to be taken into account are determined by the licensing requirements.

Per-seat licensing is common for products used by specialised professionals in industrial settings. In addition to computer  programming, typical examples include chemists, molecular biologists, geographers, and designers.

Per-seat licensing usually only applies to intellectual property, but in 2001, per-seat licensing was applied to the real-world as part of a traveling art installation at various museums and art galleries, starting with San Francisco Art Institute (SFAI).  In this exhibit, seating was equipped with retractable spikes, the spikes retracting when payment was inserted.  Various licensing schemes were offered, including a floating license which would allow the owner of the license to sit on any ONE (i.e. not be able to share the seating license) of the Internet-connected chairs; the license only allowed one set of spikes to retract at-a-time, thus creating a floating license to real physical objects (e.g. seating, and various other physical objects).

References 

Software licenses